Tuku Wachanan (Quechua tuku owl, wacha birth, to give birth, -na, -n suffixes, "where the owl is born", also spelled Tucuhuachanan) is a mountain in the Andes of Peru which reaches a height of approximately . It is located in the Ancash Region, Bolognesi Province, Cajacay District.

References

Mountains of Peru
Mountains of Ancash Region